San Mateo de Otao is one of the 32 districts of the Huarochirí Province in the Lima Region. The district was created by order of the law Nº 10001 on November 7, 1944 and its capital is San Juan de Lanca.
It has 7 villages:
San Juan de Lanca
Santo Toribio de Cumbe
San Miguel de Tapicara
Santa Cruz de Ucro
Los Milagros de Salpín
Santa Rosa de Canchacalla
San Mateo de Otao

San Mateo de Otao District has some few tourist attractions: El Kurimakas, The ruins of Marca-marca, the ruins of Huarichaca, and Quinchicocha.

Also it is a district that has many valleys of fruits like chirimoyas, avocados, apples, tumbo, and other fruits.

References